The 2017 Ukrainian Cup Final is a football match that was played on May 17, 2017 in Kharkiv. This was the fourth time the cup final was held in Kharkiv. The match was the 26th Ukrainian Cup Final since fall of the Soviet Union.

Road to Kharkiv 

Note: In all results below, the score of the finalist is given first (H: home; A: away).

Previous encounters 

The game between Shakhtar and Dynamo has become the main fixture of every season and received the nickname of Klasychne which means Classic. Before this game both teams met in a final of Ukrainian Cup eight times, the first being back in 2002. Before this final out of the previous eight, Shakhtar won 3 games and Dynamo won 4, one more game Dynamo won on penalty kicks. Games between the two clubs are known to be very intense and out of the eight previous meetings in the final, only one in 2003 did not have red cards shown to players.

Match

Details

See also
 2016–17 Ukrainian Premier League

References

Cup Final
 Ukrainian Cup finals
Ukrainian Cup Final 2017
Ukrainian Cup Final 2017
Ukrainian Cup Final 2017
Ukrainian Cup Final